6489 Golevka is an Apollo, Mars-crosser, and Alinda asteroid discovered in 1991 by Eleanor F. Helin.

Its name has a complicated origin. In 1995, Golevka was studied simultaneously by three radar observatories across the world: Goldstone in California, Yevpatoria RT-70 radio telescope in Ukraine (Yevpatoria is sometimes romanized as Evpatoria) and Kashima in Japan. 'Golevka' comes from the first few letters of each observatory's name; it was proposed by the discoverer following a suggestion by Alexander L. Zaitsev.

Golevka is a small object, measuring 0.6 × 1.4 km. The radar observations revealed that it has a very strange, angular shape that looks different depending on the direction. In 2003 the Yarkovsky effect was first observed at work by high-precision radar observations of Golevka. This helped evaluate the asteroid's bulk density (2.7 ± 0.5 g/cm3) and mass (2.10 kg).

On the other hand, Golevka's collision probability with any planet is negligible for at least the next nine centuries. Its orbit is strikingly similar to that of 4179 Toutatis in eccentricity, semi-major axis, and inclination. However, Toutatis is better known due to a close approach to Earth in 2004.

References

External links 

 Intercontinental Bistatic Radar Observations of 6489 Golevka (1991 JX)
 
 
 

006489
006489
Discoveries by Eleanor F. Helin
Named minor planets
006489
006489
19910510